'''Birds formally described as "ferruginous" include the following:
 Antbirds:
Ferruginous antbird
Ferruginous-backed antbird
Ferruginous babbler
Ferruginous duck
Ferruginous flycatcher
Ferruginous hawk
Ferruginous partridge
Ferruginous pochard
Ferruginous pygmy owl

Bird common names